Inka Laqaya (Aymara Inka Inca, laqaya ruins of a building, also spelled Inca Racaya, Inca Lacaya) is a mountain in the Bolivian Andes which reaches a height of approximately . It is located in the Cochabamba Department, Quillacollo Province, Sipe Sipe Municipality, southwest of Sipe Sipe.

References 

Mountains of Cochabamba Department